Crossing the under surface of the sphenoid the sphenopalatine artery ends on the nasal septum as the posterior septal branches; these anastomose with the ethmoidal arteries and the septal branch of the superior labial; one branch descends in a groove on the vomer to the incisive canal and anastomoses with the descending palatine artery.

References

Arteries of the head and neck